Valparaíso is a town and municipality in Antioquia Department, Colombia. Part of the subregion of Southwestern Antioquia. Its population is 8,033 according to the last census in 2002.

Municipalities of Antioquia Department